, was an engineer, entrepreneur, politician and cabinet minister in the Empire of Japan, serving as a member of the Upper House of the Diet of Japan, and five times as a cabinet minister.

Biography 
Hatta was born in Tokyo, and was a graduate from Tokyo Imperial University with a degree in civil engineering. He was employed by the San'yō Railway from 1903. However, he was recruited into the government bureaucracy, and transferred a position within the Railroad Bureau of the Ministry of Communications in 1906. After the Railway Ministry was created, Hatta was appointed a Director in 1926. He was further awarded with a seat in the House of Peers from 1929.

With the creation of the South Manchurian Railway Company (SMR), Hatta was appointed Vice President in 1932. He reorganized the management of the SMR, favoring increased cooperation with the Kwantung Army after the Manchurian Incident. He also encouraged French investment in the construction of the new capital of Manchukuo, Shinkyo

In 1934, under the Hiranuma administration, Hatta was asked to serve as both Minister of Commerce and as Minister of Colonial Affairs. He was also made head of the Japan Chamber of Commerce and Industry and the Tokyo Chamber of Commerce and Industry.

In 1941, many small private railway companies were merged under government pressure into the Tobu Railway, as per the syndicalist economic policies of the Taisei Yokusankai. Hatta was appointed Chairman of the Board of the expanded company. In 1943, he was asked to serve concurrently as Minister of Communications and Railroad Minister, this time under the Tōjō administration. During this administration, the two cabinet-level posts were merged into the new Ministry of Transport and Communications in 1943, and Hatta became the first head of the combined ministry. In 1945, Hatta became president of the North China Development Company, a subsidiary of the South Manchurian Railway dedicated to the economic development of the areas of northern China under occupation by Japan.

Following the surrender of Japan and the end of World War II, Hatta was purged from public office by the Supreme Commander of the Allied Powers. In 1953, he became president of Takushoku University, a post which he held to September 1954. In 1955, he became president of Nippei Kōsan Corporation, and Chairman of the Japan Science Foundation. In 1956, he founded the Nippon Gijustu Kyōwa Kaihatsu Corporation, and in 1957 he was named chairman of the forerunner to the Japan Highway Public Corporation. Hatta died in 1964.

References

Notes

|-

|-

|-

|-

|-

1879 births
1964 deaths
People from Tokyo
Members of the House of Peers (Japan)
Government ministers of Japan
University of Tokyo alumni
Presidents of the Japan Society of Civil Engineers